This article is about the demographic features of the population of Lesotho, including population density, ethnicity, education level, health of the populace, economic status, religious affiliations and other aspects of the population.

The Demographics of Lesotho describe the condition and overview of Lesotho's people, residents of which are called Basotho in the plural and Mosotho in the singular. Demographic topics include basic education, health, and population statistics as well as identified racial and religious affiliations.

Population

According to the 2016 census, Lesotho has a total population of 2,007,201. Of the population, 34.17 percent lived in urban and 65.83 percent in rural areas. The country's capital, Maseru, accounts for around half of the total urban population. The sex distribution is 982,133 male and 1,025,068 female, or around 96 males for each 100 females.

The average population density in the country is around 66,1 people per square kilometer. The density is lower in the Lesotho Highlands than in the western lowlands. Although the majority of the population—56.1 percent—is between 15 and 64 years of age, Lesotho has a substantial youth population numbering around 37.8 percent. The annual population growth rate is estimated at 0.13%

The proportion of children below the age of 15 in 2010 was 37.4%, 58.3% was between 15 and 65 years of age, while 4.3% was 65 years or older
.

Vital statistics
Registration of vital events is in Lesotho not complete. The Population Departement of the United Nations prepared the following estimates.

Fertility and Births
Total Fertility Rate (TFR) (Wanted Fertility Rate) and Crude Birth Rate (CBR):

Fertility data as of 2014 (DHS Program):

Life expectancy at birth 
Life expectancy from 1950 to 2015 (UN World Population Prospects):

Other demographic statistics 

Demographic statistics according to the World Population Review in 2022.

One birth every 10 minutes	
One death every 18 minutes	
One net migrant every 63 minutes	
Net gain of one person every 31 minutes

The following demographic are from the CIA World Factbook unless otherwise indicated.

6,600 people living in Lesotho are from Asia or Europe. They represent 0.3% of the total population of Lesotho. The 5,000 Chinese people form the largest non-African ethnic group in Lesotho.

Population
2,193,970 (2022 est.)
1,962,461 (July 2018 est.)

Religions
Protestant 47.8% (Pentecostal 23.1%, Lesotho Evangelical 17.3%, Anglican 7.4%), Roman Catholic 39.3%, other Christian 9.1%, non-Christian 1.4%, none 2.3% (2014 est.)

Age structure

0-14 years: 31.3% (male 309,991/female 306,321)
15-24 years: 19.26% (male 181,874/female 197,452)
25-54 years: 38.86% (male 373,323/female 391,901)
55-64 years: 4.98% (male 52,441/female 45,726)
65 years and over: 5.6% (2020 est.) (male 57,030/female 53,275)

0-14 years: 31.84% (male 314,155 /female 310,772)
15-24 years: 19.34% (male 181,332 /female 1955,236)
25-54 years: 38.27% (male 366,652 /female 384,333)
55-64 years: 5.02% (male 52,490 /female 46,016)
65 years and over: 5.53% (male 55,804 /female 52,671) (2018 est.)

Population growth rate
0.76% (2022 est.) Country comparison to the world: 121st
0.24% (2018 est.) Country comparison to the world: 178th

Birth rate
23.15 births/1,000 population (2022 est.) Country comparison to the world: 50th
24.2 births/1,000 population (2018 est.) Country comparison to the world: 52nd

Death rate
11.05 deaths/1,000 population (2022 est.) Country comparison to the world: 22nd
15.1 deaths/1,000 population (2018 est.)

Total fertility rate
2.92 children born/woman (2022 est.) Country comparison to the world: 51st
2.59 children born/woman (2018 est.) Country comparison to the world: 72nd

Median age
total: 24.7 years. Country comparison to the world: 164th
male: 24.7 years
female: 24.7 years (2020 est.)

total: 24.4 years. Country comparison to the world: 164th
male: 24.4 years 
female: 24.3 years (2018 est.)

Mother's mean age at first birth
20.9 years (2014 est.)
note: median age at first birth among women 25-49

Contraceptive prevalence rate
64.9% (2018)
60.2% (2014)

Net migration rate
-4.55 migrant(s)/1,000 population (2022 est.) Country comparison to the world: 199th
-6.8 migrant(s)/1,000 population (2017 est.) Country comparison to the world: 203rd

Major infectious diseases
degree of risk: intermediate (2020)
food or waterborne diseases: bacterial diarrhea, hepatitis A, and typhoid fever

Dependency ratios
total dependency ratio: 66.9 (2015 est.)
youth dependency ratio: 59.5 (2015 est.)
elderly dependency ratio: 7.4 (2015 est.)
potential support ratio: 13.5 (2015 est.)

Urbanization
urban population: 29.9% of total population (2022)
rate of urbanization: 2.77% annual rate of change (2020-25 est.)

urban population: 30.2% of total population (2018)
rate of urbanization: 2.83% annual rate of change (2015-20 est.)

Life expectancy at birth
total population: 59.57 years. Country comparison to the world: 220th
male: 57.57 years
female: 61.64 years (2022 est.)

total population: 53 years (2018 est.)
male: 53 years (2018 est.)
female: 53.1 years (2018 est.)

Education expenditures
7.4% of GDP (2020) Country comparison to the world: 16th

Literacy
definition: age 15 and over can read and write (2015 est.)
total population: 79.4% (2015 est.)
male: 70.1% (2015 est.)
female: 88.3% (2015 est.)

School life expectancy (primary to tertiary education)
total: 12 years
male: 12 years
female: 13 years (2017)

total: 11 years (2015)
male: 10 years (2015)
female: 11 years (2015)

Unemployment, youth ages 15-24
total: 34.4% (2013 est.)
male: NA (2013 est.)
female: NA (2013 est.)

Ethnic groups and languages

Due to Lesotho's long history as a unified nation, that continued even through British colonial rule, the ethnic makeup of the country is very homogenous. Lesotho's ethno-linguistic structure consists almost entirely of the Basotho (singular Mosotho), a Bantu-speaking people: an estimate of 99.7 percent of the people identify as Basotho. The Kwena (Bakoena) are the largest subgroup of the Sotho; other Basotho subgroups include the Natal (North) Nguni, Batloung (the Tlou), Baphuthi (the Phuti), Bafokeng, Bataung (the Tau), Bats'oeneng (the tso'ene) and the Cape (South) Nguni (Thembu). Other ethnic groups include Europeans, numbering in the thousands, and several hundred Asians.

Sesotho (Southern Sotho) and English languages are both official. Afrikaans, Zulu, Xhosa and French are also spoken.

Religion

The population of Lesotho is estimated to be around 90 percent Christian. Roman Catholics, the largest religious group, make up around 45 percent of the population. Evangelicals comprise 26 percent of the population, and Anglican and other Christian groups an additional 19 percent. Muslims, Hindus, Buddhists, Baháʼí, and members of traditional indigenous religions comprise the remaining 10 percent of the population.

Education and literacy
According to recent estimates, 85 percent of the population 15 and over was literate. Among women the literacy rate was around 95 percent, and among men around 75 percent. As such, Lesotho boasts one of the higher literacy rates in Africa.  Although education is not compulsory, the Government of Lesotho is incrementally implementing a programme for free primary education. It was expected that the program would be fully in place by 2006. The National University of Lesotho located in Roma and the Limkokwing University of Creative Technology located in the heart of Maseru, Moshoeshoe 2 are the only universities in the country. In addition, the country has almost 20 other public and 15 private institutes giving tertiary education.

References

Attribution

 
Society of Lesotho